Radeon X Series can refer to:

 ATi Radeon R300 Series (Radeon X300, X600 series)
 ATi Radeon R400 Series (Radeon X700, X800 series)
 Radeon X1000 series (Radeon X1000 series)